Melakwa Lake is a lake in King County, Washington.  The name Melakwa comes from a Chinook term for "mosquito".  It is located along the Pratt River just below the river's true source.

Access 

It is off of I-90 and can be accessed from the Denny Creek trail head.  It is accessible via a moderate, all-day hike from Denny Creek to Melakwa Lake.

Characteristics 

The lake is located in a narrow valley, with Chair Peak to the east and Kaleetan Peak to the west, and is usually accessible by late June. It is known for its clear water and beautiful blue-green color. A short scramble up the talus slope on the north end of the lake leads to Melakwa Pass, where views of Gem Lake, Glacier Peak, and the North Cascades are visible on clear days.

See also

Upper Melakwa Lake

References

External links
 Hiking Melakwa Lake from OutdoorDB.org

Lakes of King County, Washington
Lakes of Washington (state)
Chinook Jargon place names
Mount Baker-Snoqualmie National Forest
Protected areas of King County, Washington